MuscleMag International or Musclemag was a Canadian bodybuilding, fitness and men's magazine, considered one of the top magazines in its field. It was established in Canada in 1974 by Robert Kennedy, an immigrant to Canada and leading expert in fitness and bodybuilding, with an initial print run of 110,000.
It divided its magazine and website into Muscle Building, Nutrition and Supplements, Strength Training, Culture
and Girls, regularly featuring fitness and glamour models and sex tips.

Kennedy died in 2012, and his company filed for bankruptcy the next year. MuscleMag was acquired by Active Interest Media. It ended publication on 7 June 2013.

References

External links
 Official Website at web.archive

Bodybuilding magazines
Defunct magazines published in Canada
Fitness magazines
Magazines established in 1974
Magazines disestablished in 2013
Magazines published in California
Men's magazines published in Canada
Sports magazines published in Canada